K29 may refer to:
 K-29 (Kansas highway)
 Council Airport, in Alaska
 , a corvette of the Royal Navy
 K-29 trailer, part of the SCR-277 radio navigation system
 Kevlar K-29, a grade of Kevlar
 Sonata in D, K. 29, by Wolfgang Amadeus Mozart